Playing Favorites is a live album by 10,000 Maniacs released in 2016. The album was recorded on September 13, 2014, at the Reg Lenna Center for the Arts in Jamestown, New York. This is their first live album with current lead vocalist Mary Ramsey and also marks the return of founding member John Lombardo who contributes lead vocals on "My Mother the War".

Track listing
"What's the Matter Here" (Rob Buck, Natalie Merchant) – 5:11
"Like the Weather" (Natalie Merchant) – 4:10
"Love Among the Ruins" (Jerome Augustyniak, Rob Buck, Dennis Drew, Steve Gustafson, John Lombardo, Mary Ramsey, Jules Shear) – 4:15
"Trouble Me" (Dennis Drew, Natalie Merchant) – 3:25
"More Than This" (Bryan Ferry) – 4:08
"Can't Ignore the Train" (John Lombardo, Natalie Merchant)  – 3:29
"Stockton Gala Days" (Jerome Augustyniak, Rob Buck, Dennis Drew, Steve Gustafson, Natalie Merchant) – 7:38
"Because the Night" (Patti Smith, Bruce Springsteen) – 5:38
"Rainy Day" (Jerome Augustyniak, Rob Buck, Dennis Drew, Steve Gustafson, John Lombardo, Mary Ramsey) – 6:56
"Candy Everybody Wants" (Dennis Drew, Natalie Merchant) – 3:21
"My Sister Rose" (Jerome Augustyniak, Natalie Merchant) – 4:19
"Hey Jack Kerouac" (Rob Buck, Natalie Merchant) – 3:46
"These Are Days" (Rob Buck, Natalie Merchant) – 5:03
"My Mother the War" (John Lombardo, Natalie Merchant, Michael Walsh) - 4:42

Personnel
10,000 Maniacs
Jerome Augustyniak – drums, backing vocals
Dennis Drew – keyboards, mixing
Jeff Erickson – lead guitar
Steve Gustafson – bass guitar, backing vocals, mixing
John Lombardo – guitar, lead vocals on "My Mother the War"
Mary Ramsey – lead vocals, viola

Additional musicians
Melanie Luciano – backing vocals, acoustic guitar
Bryan Eckenrode – cello
Oliver Chezliak – trombone
Eric Crittenden – alto saxophone
Robert Browning – tenor saxophone

Additional album credits
Produced and by Armand John Petri and 10,000 Maniacs
Engineered and mixed by Armand John Petri
Mastered by Vic Anesini at Battery Studios, New York

References 

2016 live albums
10,000 Maniacs live albums